Lionel George Logue,  (26 February 1880 – 12 April 1953) was an Australian speech and language therapist and amateur stage actor who helped King George VI manage his stammer.

Early life and family
Lionel George Logue was born in College Town, Adelaide, South Australia, the oldest of four children. His grandfather Edward Logue, originally from Dublin, in 1856 founded Logue's Brewery, a predecessor of the South Australian Brewing Company. His parents were George Edward Logue, an accountant at his grandfather's brewery who later managed the Burnside Hotel and the Elephant and Castle Hotel, and Lavinia Rankin. Although not a Catholic himself, he was reportedly related to Michael Cardinal Logue, a native of County Donegal, who was the Roman Catholic Primate of All Ireland and Archbishop of Armagh in the late 19th and early 20th centuries.

He attended Prince Alfred College between 1889 and 1896. Unable to decide what to study, Logue came across Longfellow's The Song of Hiawatha:

The poem's rhythm inspired Logue to put his interest in voices to good use. After leaving school at sixteen, he received elocution training from Edward Reeves. Reeves had moved to Adelaide in 1878 and taught elocution to his pupils by day and gave popular recitals to audiences in Victoria Hall by night. Logue worked for Reeves as a secretary and assistant teacher from 1902, while studying music at the University of Adelaide's Elder Conservatorium. While working for Reeves, Logue began to give recitals of his own for which he was praised for his "clear, powerful voice."

After his father died on 17 November 1902, Logue set up his own practice as a teacher of elocution. By 1904, he had gained a good reputation and was receiving praise from the local newspapers. However, he decided to take a contract with an engineering firm some  westward in Kalgoorlie, Western Australia, installing an electricity supply at a gold mine.

Professional career
His professional career began in Perth, where, in addition to teaching elocution, acting, and public speaking, he put on plays and recitations, and also founded a club for public speakers. He was also involved with YMCA Perth and schools such as Methodist Ladies' College, Loreto Convent, Scotch College, Perth Technical School, and Claremont Teachers College.

In 1911, Logue and his wife set out on a tour of the world to study methods of public speaking. Later he developed treatments for Australian First World War war veterans who had shell shock-induced impaired speech. In addition to physical exercises, which helped with patients' breathing, Logue's distinctive therapy emphasised humour, patience, and "superhuman sympathy".

In 1924, Logue took his wife and three sons to England, ostensibly for a holiday. Once there, he 
took jobs teaching elocution at schools around London, and in 1926 he opened a speech-defect practice at 146 Harley Street. Logue used fees paid by wealthy clients to subsidise patients unable to pay.  It was here that the Duke of Yorkthe future King George VIsought Logue's help. Logue became a founding fellow of the Royal College of Speech and Language Therapists in 1944.

Treatment of George VI
As a speech therapist, Logue was self-taught and was initially dismissed by the medical establishment as a quack, but he worked with the Duke from the late 1920s into the mid-1940s.

Before ascending the throne as George VI, the Duke of York dreaded public speaking because of a severe stammer; his closing speech at the British Empire Exhibition at Wembley on 31 October 1925 proved an ordeal for speaker and listeners alike. The Duke resolved to find some way to manage his stammer, and engaged Logue in 1926 after being introduced to him by Lord Stamfordham.

Diagnosing poor co-ordination between the Duke's larynx and thoracic diaphragm, Logue prescribed a daily hour of vocal exercises. Logue's treatment gave the Duke the confidence to relax and avoid tension-induced muscle spasms. As a result, he only occasionally stammered. By 1927, he was speaking confidently and managed his address at the opening of the Old Parliament House in Canberra without stammering.

Logue was often called over the years when the king was expected to make a speech, and was regularly invited to the Royal Family's Christmas dinner party in order to assist with the Christmas message. Their relationship was featured in a film, a play and a book.

Honours
In 1944, King George VI appointed Logue a Commander of the Royal Victorian Order (CVO), elevating him from Member of the Order (MVO), which had been conferred upon Logue at the time of George VI's Coronation.

King George VI died on 6 February 1952. On 26 February 1952, Logue wrote to the late king's wife, Queen Elizabeth The Queen Mother:

The Queen Mother replied:  "I think that I know perhaps better than anyone just how much you helped the King, not only with his speech, but through that his whole life and outlook on life. I shall always be deeply grateful to you for all you did for him."

Personal life

Logue married Myrtle Gruenert, a 21-year-old clerk, at St George's Anglican Cathedral, Perth, on 20 March 1907. They had three sons, Valentine, Laurie, and Anthony. Valentine trained at King's College London and St George's Hospital and went on to become one of the most distinguished neurosurgeons of his generation.

Lionel Logue was a Freemason, initiated, passed, and raised in 1908, and became Worshipful Master in 1919; he was a member of St. George's Lodge (now J.D. Stevenson St. George's Lodge No.6, Western Australian Constitution).

He lived in a 25-room Victorian villa called Beechgrove in Sydenham from 1932 until 1947, now demolished and part of Sydenham Hill Wood.

Myrtle died suddenly from a heart attack in June 1945, and Logue died in London, on 12 April 1953. His funeral was held on 17 April in Holy Trinity Brompton before his body was cremated. Representatives of Queen Elizabeth II and Queen Elizabeth The Queen Mother attended the funeral.

In popular culture
With Peter Conradi, Logue's grandson Mark wrote a book, The King's Speech: How One Man Saved the British Monarchy, about his grandfather's relationship with the king. In the 2010 British film The King's Speech, written by David Seidler, Logue was played by Geoffrey Rush, his wife by Jennifer Ehle, and his patient by Colin Firth. In the West End stage adaptation of The King's Speech at Wyndham's Theatre, Australian actor Jonathan Hyde played Lionel Logue, and in the US stage premiere, Logue was played by James Frain.

Welsh actor Michael Elwyn played Logue in the 2002 television film Bertie and Elizabeth. Derek Lawson portrayed Logue in the 2015 comedy A Royal Night Out.

See also
Speech and language pathology
British Stammering Association

References
Notes

Sources
 Australian Dictionary of Biography
 BBC Interview with Mark Logue (4 January 2011), about finding Lionel Logue's notes
 "Chance Meeting Led to Cure of King's Stutter", The Sydney Morning Herald (Monday, 11 February 1952), p. 3.
 Darbyshire, T., The Duke of York: an intimate and authoritative life story of the second son of Their Majesties the King and Queen by one who has had special facilities, and published with the approval of His Royal Highness, Hutchinson, (London), 1929
 (Note: co-author Mark Logue is a grandson of the subject, Lionel Logue).
 Moses, E., & E. M. Foley, "The King's Speech", The Sydney Morning Herald, (Thursday, 24 December 1936), p. 5.
 
 St. Claire, M. "An Australian Cures Defect in King's Speech", The Australian Women's Weekly, (Saturday, 2 January 1937), p. 12

External links
"Lionel Logue 'never swore in front of King George VI'", BBC Radio Leicester
 Bowen, Caroline (2002). Lionel Logue: Pioneer speech therapist. Retrieved 1 January 2011
 Hutchinson, Norman C. (2010). Lionel Logue: the King's Mentor, self-published, Box Hill South, Victoria, Australia
 * "King Honors Australian Who Alleviated Stammer", New York Times, (11 May 1937)
 Letter sent by Logue to George VI, Royal College of Speech and Language Therapists archives
Rare photo of Lionel Logue near the end of his life, from the UK National Archives

1880 births
1953 deaths
Australian scientists
Australian people of Irish descent
Australian expatriates in the United Kingdom
Australian Christian Scientists
Australian Commanders of the Royal Victorian Order
People educated at Prince Alfred College
Speech and language pathologists
People from Adelaide
Stuttering